Cindy Forster (born ) is a politician in Ontario, Canada. She was a New Democratic member of the Legislative Assembly of Ontario who represented the riding of Welland as an MPP from 2011 until 2018.

Background
Forster was born and raised in Welland, Ontario. She worked as a nurse before entering politics.

Politics
Forster was mayor of Welland from 2000 to 2003, and later represented the city on Niagara Regional Council. She was succeeded on Niagara Regional Council by Peter Kormos, her predecessor as Welland's MPP.

She ran in the 2011 provincial election as the New Democratic candidate in the riding of Welland. She defeated Progressive Conservative candidate Domenic Ursini by 5,479 votes. She was re-elected in the 2014 provincial election defeating PC candidate Frank Campion by 8,334 votes.

She is the party's critic for Labour.

On January 3, 2017, Forster announced that she would not seek re-election in 2018.

References

External links

1953 births
Living people
Mayors of Welland
Ontario New Democratic Party MPPs
Women mayors of places in Ontario
Women MPPs in Ontario
21st-century Canadian politicians
21st-century Canadian women politicians